LaSane is a surname. Notable people with the surname include:

Bruce LaSane (born 1967), American football player
Harry LaSane (1924–1984), American boxer